The 1906–07 season was Sport Lisboa e Benfica's third season in existence and the club's first competitive season, still under the name Sport Lisboa.

This season, Benfica finished second to Carcavelos SC in the Campeonato de Lisboa, the only official competition at the time, composed of four teams. Benfica's most memorable match of the season was the 2–1 win against Carcavelos, a team that was filled with English players and that was unbeaten since 1898.

Campeonato de Lisboa

Table

Matches

Player statistics

|}

References

 

S.L. Benfica seasons
Sport Lisboa season
Sport Lisboa season
1906–07 in Portuguese football